The Affair of the Poisons (French: L'affaire des poisons) is a 1907 historical play by the dramatist Victorien Sardou. It portrays the events of the real-life Affair of the Poisons during the reign of Louis XIV and the downfall of his mistress Madame de Montespan. It was Sardou's final play.

Film adaptation
In 1955 it was made into a French-Italian film of the same title directed by Henri Decoin and starring Danielle Darrieux, Viviane Romance and Paul Meurisse.

References

Bibliography
 Goble, Alan. The Complete Index to Literary Sources in Film. Walter de Gruyter, 1999.
 Hart, Jerome Alfred. Sardou and the Sardou Plays. J.B. Lippincott, 1913.
 Schumacher, Claude, Northam, John & Wickham, Glynne W. Naturalism and Symbolism in European Theatre 1850-1918.Cambridge University Press, 1996.

1907 plays
French plays
French plays adapted into films
Plays based on actual events
Plays set in France
Cultural depictions of Louis XIV
Plays set in the 17th century
Plays by Victorien Sardou